Zasechnoye is a rural locality (a village) in Sidorovskoye Rural Settlement, Gryazovetsky District, Vologda Oblast, Russia. The population was 8 as of 2002.

Geography 
Zasechnoye is located 39 km east of Gryazovets (the district's administrative centre) by road. Obukhovo is the nearest rural locality.

References 

Rural localities in Gryazovetsky District